Yuan Leshang (born 565), later Buddhist nun name Huasheng (華勝), was a concubine of the Emperor Xuan of the Northern Zhou dynasty of China.

Yuan Leshang's father was Yuan Sheng (元晟), a Northern Zhou official and a descendant of the Northern Wei's imperial Yuan clan. In 579, Yuan Leshang was selected to be an imperial consort for Emperor Xuan, with the title of Guifei (貴妃).  A month later, Emperor Xuan passed the throne to his son Emperor Jing and took an atypical title for a retired emperor, "Emperor Tianyuan" (天元皇帝, Tianyuan Huangdi).  He subsequently decided that in addition to his wife Empress Yang Lihua, he would create three more empresses, and Consort Yuan was selected as one—with the title of Empress Tianyou (天右皇后, Tianyou Huanghou), subsequently changed in spring 580 to Tianyou Da Huanghou (天右大皇后). Among the empresses, she was said to be closest to Chen Yueyi, as they entered the palace at the same time and were the same age, and they were also both favored by Emperor Xuan.

Emperor Xuan died in summer 580, and Empress Yang's father Yang Jian became regent.  Empress Yuan became a Buddhist nun with the name of Huasheng, and she outlived Yang Jian's subsequent Sui dynasty.  According to both the Book of Zhou and History of Northern Dynasties, she was still alive as of the reign of Emperor Taizong of Tang (626-649), but nothing further was recorded in either of those two official histories about her.

References 

Northern Zhou empresses
Northern Zhou Buddhists
Sui dynasty Buddhists
Tang dynasty Buddhists
Chinese Buddhist nuns
6th-century Buddhist nuns
7th-century Buddhist nuns
565 births
7th-century deaths